Salimgarh Fort (Salim's Fort) was built in 1546 AD, in Delhi, in a former island of the Yamuna River, by Salim Shah Suri, son of Sher Shah Suri. There was a pause in Mughal rule when in 1540 AD Sher Shah Suri defeated the Mughal emperor Humayun (and ousted him from Delhi) and established the Sur dynasty rule in Delhi. Sur dynasty rule lasted till 1555 AD when Humayun regained his kingdom by defeating Sikander Suri, the last ruler of the dynasty. During the Mughal period, in later years, while building the Red Fort and Shahjahanbad, several Mughal rulers reigned, including Emperor Shahjahan, who is credited with completing Shahjahanabad in 1639 AD had camped at the fort. It is said that Humayun had camped at the fort for three days before launching his successful attack for recapturing Delhi.

Aurangzeb, the Mughal emperor, converted the fort into a prison, which practice was perpetuated by the British who took control of the fort in 1857. The fort is part of the Red Fort Complex. The complex was declared as a UNESCO World Heritage Site in 2007, which obligates the Archaeological Survey of India (ASl) to ensure well-planned conservation measures for the heritage monuments.

History
This topography of the land area with the rock exposures at the fort's location, with a favourable link with the northeast trending ridge and the main mosque (Jama Masjid), was visualised as an ideal setting that provided the needed protection against erosion by the Yamuna River. It was also obvious that a stream on one side and a mountain ridge on the other side of any fortification would be a formidable barrier for invaders to penetrate into Delhi, as such a setting would only force the invaders to follow the river course. Keeping these advantages in view the Salimgarh Fort was built in 1546.

However, Humayun after he won back the Empire had renamed Salimghar Fort as "Nurghar" since the first ruler of the Sur dynasty, Sher Shah Suri (father of Salim Shah Suri who had built the fort) had earlier usurped his Kingdom in 1540 AD. He had, therefore, decreed that nobody would use its original name in his court.

During the British rule, the Indian Rebellion of 1857, which was eventually put down in 1858, led to the last Mughal Emperor Bahadur Shah Zafar II was taken prisoner at Humayun tomb. This fort was then the scene of a lot of war activity. During the rebellion, Emperor Bahadur Shah II‘s "complicity with the mutinous soldiers was obvious", as seen from the British viewpoint. He operated from this fort. During August and early September 1857, he held meetings at the fort on war strategy. He also watched, from the ramparts of the fort, artillery fire aimed at the British Indian Army. He even played a psychological game with his army officers who had come in a delegation seeking salary, when he told them that he would forego some of his crown jewels for the purpose and that he would give up his life for the cause; the officers refused his offer trusting that the Emperor was stating all this in right earnest. Following this, even proclamations were issued declaring that the Emperor would lead the attack against the British and urging all his people, irrespective of caste or creed, to join him in fighting the war. But, in the middle of September 1857, British soldiers were closing in on the fort. At this stage, his trusted assistant Bhakt Khan urged the Emperor to leave the fort and accompany him to a safer place and look for a day when he could "renew war in the open country". But the Emperor refused, permitted his army to vacate the fort but he himself moved to the Humayun tomb. The fourth infantry of the British army entered the Salimgarh Fort where they encountered a single entry only. Similar experience was encountered by the Punjab Fourth infantry regiment when, earlier, they had entered the palace from the Lahore gate of the Red Fort.

After the rebellion was put down, the fort was, for a time, used by the British as an army camp (with artillery units) but was subsequently, from 1945, used as a penitentiary to hold prisoners from the Indian National Army (INA).

Structure

The fort has a triangular plan, and its thick walls are built in rubble masonry. It has circular bastions. From the time it was built, the fort structure has undergone several stages of repairs over the centuries. An arch bridge links it with the Red Fort on the northeastern side, which was constructed during Bahadur Shah Zafar's reign, and hence the gate is named as Bahadur Shah Gate. The gate is built of brick masonry with selective use of red sandstone. During British rule, a railway line was constructed, after demolishing an old bridge, which divided the Salimgarh Fort and chipped part of the Red Fort, and which was then considered an uncaring action. This railway line has truncated the fort.

As a prison
During Aurangzeb's reign, the fort was first converted into a prison. Aurangzeb had imprisoned his brother Murad Baksh (whom he had caught unawares while sleeping after a drinking binge at Mutra) who had acted as his confidant and supporter during his fight with his elder brother Dara Shikoh, at this fort for reasons of "apostasy for abandoning the fundamental tenets of Islam". He was later shifted to Gwalior where he was executed. It is also said that Auranagzeb, apart from imprisoning Murad Baksh, had the dubious credit of incarcerating his favourite eldest daughter Zebunnisa in the Salimgarh Fort for 21 years till her death. It was stated that she was imprisoned for being a poetess and a musician (both anathema to Aurangzeb's austere, more orthodox and fundamental way of life and thinking) and for being sympathetic to her brother Muhammad Akbar who was persona non–grata with the Emperor. The British had kept Bahadur Shah incarcerated at this fort, after he was taken prisoner at Humayun tomb and later shifted to Rangoon, Burma. The fort has been compared to the Tower of London in England where state prisoners were either tormented to death or faded away in the prison.

Before India got Independence from the British Rule, prisoners from the Indian National Army (INA) were also imprisoned in this fort from 1945 until India's independence in August 1947. Hence, Salimghar Fort is now renamed as Swatantrata Senani Smarak in memory of the prisoners who died in this fort prison.

Ghosts are said to haunt the fort area and several stories are narrated in this regard. One of them relates to Zebunnisa wearing a black veil singing poems composed by her, on moonlit nights. It is also mentioned that the moans and groans of the soldiers of INA who were tortured and who died here are heard in the vicinity.
Thus, this fort established a strong link between the Mughal rule and the British rule.

Fort conservation measures

The fort which had been continuously occupied by the Army, from the time of first independence movement in 1857 till 2005, was initially under the British army control with artillery units headquartered there and also as a prison, and subsequently it was under the control of the Indian Army after India's Independence on 15 August 1947. Several other government agencies, including ASI, were also involved with the upkeep of the monuments. This became an issue when ASI had approached UNESCO in 1992 to include this monument for inscription on World Heritage List. Hence, at that time ASI withdrew the application for listing by UNESCO. The multi control of the fort was causing problems to the ASI in taking adequate conservation measures to protect and preserve this monument, along with the Red Fort and other monuments within the fort complex. ASI had petitioned the Courts through an affidavit stating: "It is impossible to maintain these portions of the fort unless and until they are completely vacated and handed over to the ASI for proper assessment of the damage already caused". ASI had also stated that the Ministry of Tourism of the Government of India would approach the UNESCO to accord world heritage status to the monument once it was transferred to their complete jurisdiction and after completing the needed restoration works. The Army transferred the fort to ASI's possession in December 2003 and thereafter, in 2006, the ASI submitted its proposal for World Heritage listing by UNESCO. Finally, the World Heritage Committee accepted Government of India's request and accorded approval for inscription of the Red Fort Complex, Delhi in the World Heritage List, in its meeting held from 23 to 27 June 2007 at Christchurch, New Zealand. The Press release issued by the ASI, after UNESCO listing was approved, states:"The core zone of about hectare includes the Red Fort and Salimgarh Fort while the buffer zone measuring over 40 hectares includes the immediate surroundings of the Red Fort and Salimgarh Fort. The Red Fort Complex, Delhi is classified as a cultural property with an outstanding universal significance. The inscription of the Red Fort on the World Heritage List is very significant for Delhi since the Red Fort Complex would be the third World Heritage Site in the city, an honour that no other single location in the country can boast of."
Further to the above listing, ASI at the directive of the Supreme Court of India, prepared a draft report presenting a "Comprehensive Conservation Management Plan (CCMP)” based on a detailed study of the site's importance. The plan has taken due cognizance of the role and duties of management of the fort by various departments and agencies that operated from within the fort. The plan also envisages restoration of the old bridge that links Red Fort to Salimgarh since it provides historical link between the Mughal Rule and the British Rule.

Till the time the CCMP is approved and items of work are prioritised, ASI has undertaken several restoration actions in the Red Fort at a cost of Rs 27.5 million (US$0.55 million) and at Salimgarh Fort at a cost of Rs 8 million (US$160,000) to be completed before the 2010 Commonwealth Games.

Museum

The Swatantra Sangram Museum, which opened to the public on 2 October 1995, is located in the precincts of the Red Fort Complex within the Salimgarh Fort as it was the prison where the INA prisoners were incarcerated by the British from 1945 till Independence of India from British rule on 15 August 1947. Many of the prisoners had died within the jail premises. The place was chosen as the site for the museum on the basis of initial identification provided by Colonel Gurbaksh Singh Dhillon of the location where the British had held trial of the Indian National Army prisoners for treason in 1945. Since then he retracted (after the present museum was completed) his selection of the site and indicated a new building adjoining the existing museum as the site where the trial was held. In 2007 (the 60th Year of India's Independence), ASI decided to shift the museum to the new location but "with more documents for the new galleries, apart from providing better lighting, panelling, and displays for existing structures." On this occasion, a section on Mahatma Gandhi was also proposed to be added to the museum with full–size depictions of the Jallianwala Bagh firing and the Salt Satyagraha. At the Prime Minister's intervention the premises of the fort and the museum have been opened to the public. To encourage tourists to visit this place, ASI has also introduced guides at the Red Fort gate to give directions to this Fort, which till recently was hardly known to the public vis-à-vis the famous Red Fort. Also, the long walk from the Red Fort gate to this place discouraged people from visiting the fort and the museum.

Access
.  In the initial years, the fort was accessed through boats only but a bridge linking the Red Fort with Salimgarh Fort was said to have been built by Jahangir, father of Shahajahan; a conflicting information also attributes its construction by Farid Khan who held the fort in Jagir. This bridge was later replaced by a railway bridge at the same location. At present, an arched over bridge connects it from the Red Fort end. From this location, the fort provides a commanding view of the Red Fort, the river and the surroundings. But it is a noisy area with continuous flow of heavy traffic from the several artery roads that surround it and also from the traffic flow from the trans–Yamuna over the existing steel bridge on the main river close by.
The East India Railway was brought to Delhi through the Salimgarh Fort. The line used to pass over Salimgarh and a portion of the fort. It was later extended to the Rajputana Railway.

Gallery

References

External links

 Delhi Description of Salimgarh fort, Delhi Album of Thomas Metcalfe, 1843 British Library

Archaeological monuments in Delhi
Sur Empire
Forts in Delhi
Indian National Army trials
Mughal architecture
1546 establishments in India
Populated places established in 1546
Monuments of National Importance in Delhi